In military terms, 55th Division or 55th Infantry Division may refer to:

 Infantry divisions 
 55th Infantry Division (Bangladesh)
 British 55th Division:
 55th (West Lancashire) Division (1908-1920)
 55th (West Lancashire) Infantry Division (1921-1945)
 55th Infantry Division (France)
 55th Infantry Division Savona (Kingdom of Italy)
 55th Division (Imperial Japanese Army)
 55th Infantry Division (Poland)
 55th Naval Infantry Division (Russia)
 Soviet 55th Division
 55th Rifle Division (Soviet Union)
 55th Guards Rifle Division
 55th Infantry Division (United States)